Stine Kjær Dimun (formerly Stine Kjær Jensen; born 15 October 1979) is a Danish former football midfielder. She played for Brøndby IF and the Danish national team.

Dimun made a total of 127 appearances for Brøndby between 2003 and 2007.

References

External links
 
 Danish Football Union (DBU) statistics

1979 births
Living people
Danish women's footballers
Denmark women's international footballers
Brøndby IF (women) players
Women's association football midfielders
2007 FIFA Women's World Cup players
Association football midfielders